Kung Ako Ikaw is a Philippine television reality comedy television show broadcast by GMA Network. It premiered on July 16, 2007 replacing Who's Your Daddy Now?, Bahay Mo Ba 'To and HP: To the Highest Level Na! on the network's KiliTV line up. The show concluded on August 14, 2008 with a total of 129 episodes.

Hosts
Keempee de Leon and Joey Marquez, who reprise their respective roles of Harold (from Bahay Mo Ba 'To) and Tsong (from Lagot Ka, Isusumbong Kita served as hosts.

Concept
Each week, the show assigns three celebrities to do various blue-collar jobs for three days, under the tutelage of the Bisor (Tagalog slang for the "visor" in supervisor), a person who does the job for a living. The winner (which is determined by text votes) will bring home a cash prize, while the Bisors also receive rewards.

Accolades

References

2007 Philippine television series debuts
2008 Philippine television series endings
Filipino-language television shows
GMA Network original programming
Philippine reality television series